Willowbrook Shopping Centre (sometimes referred to as Willowbrook Mall) is a shopping centre in the Fraser Valley area of Metro Vancouver, Canada. Situated on Fraser Highway at Highway 10, Willowbrook is located between the City of Langley and Langley Township in British Columbia. The mall is 40 minutes southeast of Vancouver.

Expansion
The shopping centre opened in 1979 and has undergone a number of major expansions and renovations, with the last one in 2020. Additional renovations are scheduled and once completed, will give the shopping centre an additional  of space which will include: a food precinct, an outdoor pedestrian shopping area and gathering spaces. The number of stores will increase from 140 to more than 200 and new underground parking will be created. Some of the current above-ground parking area will serve as the footprint of the expansion of the shopping centre.

Transportation

Willowbrook is served by the 320, 370, 501, 502, 503, 531 and the 564 bus routes operated by TransLink, the transportation authority serving Metro Vancouver. TransLink plans to build Willowbrook Exchange, along with a proposed SkyTrain station as part of the Expo Line extension to Langley Centre, to serve the shopping centre and surrounding community.

See also
 List of shopping malls in Canada

References

External links
 Official website

Langley, British Columbia (district municipality)
Shopping malls in Metro Vancouver
Shopping malls established in 1979
1979 establishments in British Columbia